Farquhar Peak is a mountain on King Island, British Columbia and is the island's highest point. The peak is unofficially named after the Farquhar River.

Climate

Based on the Köppen climate classification, Farquhar Peak is located in the marine west coast climate zone of western North America. Most weather fronts originate in the Pacific Ocean, and travel east toward the Coast Mountains where they are forced upward by the range (Orographic lift), causing them to drop their moisture in the form of rain or snowfall. As a result, the Coast Mountains experience high precipitation, especially during the winter months in the form of snowfall.

Footnotes

References

One-thousanders of British Columbia
Range 3 Coast Land District